Robert Henley may refer to:

 Robert Henley (naval officer) (1783–1828), officer in the United States Navy
 Robert Henley, 1st Earl of Northington (1708–1772), Lord Chancellor of Great Britain
 Robert Henley, 2nd Baron Henley (1789–1841), British lawyer and Member of Parliament
 Robert Henley, 2nd Earl of Northington (1747–1786), British politician
 Robert Henley (cricketer) (1851–1889), English cricketer
 Robert Henley (Birmingham mayor) (1843–1873), first mayor of Birmingham, Alabama
 Robert Henley (died 1692), British Member of Parliament for Andover
 Robert Henley (born 1638), British Member of Parliament for Lyme Regis
 Robert Henley (died 1758), British Member of Parliament for Lyme Regis
 Robert "Rob" Henley, briefly the drummer for the punk rock band the Germs